Tershawn Wharton (born June 25, 1998) is an American football defensive tackle for the Kansas City Chiefs of the National Football League (NFL). He played college football at Missouri S&T.

Early life and high school
Wharton grew up in University City, Missouri and attended Maplewood Richmond Heights High School for his first three seasons before transferring to University City High School. As a senior, he recorded 110 tackles with four quarterback sacks and an interception and was named first-team All-Suburban Central Conference.

College career
Wharton was a four year starter for the Missouri S&T Miners. He was named first-team All-Great Lakes Valley Conference (GLVC) after recording 64 tackles and 13.5 sacks in his sophomore season. He had 7.5 sacks both as a junior and senior and was named first-team All-GLVC in each season. Wharton finished his collegiate career with 58 tackles for loss and 35.5 sacks.

Professional career
Wharton was signed by the Kansas City Chiefs as an undrafted free agent on April 27, 2020. He made the Chiefs final roster out of training camp. Wharton made his NFL debut in the season opener on September 10, 2020 against the Houston Texans, making two tackles in a 34–20 win.
In Week 8 against the New York Jets, Wharton recorded his first career sack during the 35–9 win. Wharton finished his rookie season with 27 tackles, four tackles for loss, and two sacks with a forced fumble and a fumble recovery.

In the Chiefs' week 5 game of the 2022 season, Wharton tore his ACL. He was placed on injured reserve on October 15, 2022. Without Wharton, the Chiefs defeated the Philadelphia Eagles in Super Bowl LVII.

References

External links
 Missouri S&T Miners bio
 Kansas City Chiefs bio

1998 births
Living people
American football defensive tackles
Kansas City Chiefs players
Missouri S&T Miners football players
Players of American football from Missouri
Sportspeople from St. Louis County, Missouri